3-Pentanol is one of the eight isomers of amyl alcohol. It is found naturally and has a role as a pheromone.

See also
 2-Pentanol

References

Alkanols